Massachusetts House of Representatives' 9th Norfolk district in the United States is one of 160 legislative districts included in the lower house of the Massachusetts General Court. It covers part of Norfolk County. Republican Shawn Dooley of Norfolk represented the district from 2014-2023.Now Marcus S. Vaughn, a Wrentham Republican, holds the seat.

Towns represented
The district includes the following localities:
 part of Medfield
 part of Millis
 Norfolk
 Plainville
 part of Walpole
 Wrentham

The district geographic boundary overlaped with those of the Massachusetts Senate's Bristol and Norfolk district and Norfolk, Bristol and Middlesex district. After the 2022 redistricting much of the district is represented by the newly created Norfolk, Worcester, and Middlesex district.

Former locales
The district previously covered:
 Avon, circa 1927 
 Holbrook, circa 1927 
 Randolph, circa 1872, 1927

Representatives
 Jonathan Wales, circa 1858 
 Daniel Howard, circa 1859 
 Albert E. Miller, circa 1888 
 Elijah Baron Stowe, circa 1888 
 Clarence F. Telford, circa 1951 
 Edna Telford, 1955-1960
 M. Joseph Manning, 1975-1979 
 Francis H. Woodward, 1979-1991
 Jo Ann Sprague, 1991-1999
 Scott P. Brown, 1999-2004 
 Richard J. Ross, 2005-2011
 Daniel Winslow, 2011-2013
 Shawn C. Dooley, 2014-2023
 Marcus S. Vaughn, 2023-present

Electoral History
The 9th Norfolk has been represented by the Republican Party since the 1992 General Election.  A special general election was held on January 7, 2014 due to Daniel Winslow's (R) resignation on September 29, 2013 from the state house to join Rimini Street as senior vice president and general counsel.

2022 9th Norfolk General Election

2020 9th Norfolk General Election

2018 9th Norfolk General Election

2016 9th Norfolk General Election

2014 9th Norfolk General Election

2014 9th Norfolk Special General Election

2012 9th Norfolk General Election

2010 9th Norfolk General Election

2008 9th Norfolk Special General Election

2006 9th Norfolk General Election

2004 9th Norfolk General Election

2002 9th Norfolk General Election

See also
 List of Massachusetts House of Representatives elections
 Other Norfolk County districts of the Massachusetts House of Representatives: 1st, 2nd, 3rd, 4th, 5th, 6th, 7th, 8th, 10th, 11th, 12th, 13th, 14th, 15th
 List of Massachusetts General Courts
 List of former districts of the Massachusetts House of Representatives

Images
Portraits of legislators

References

External links
 Ballotpedia
  (State House district information based on U.S. Census Bureau's American Community Survey).
 League of Women Voters of Westwood-Walpole-Dedham

House
Government of Norfolk County, Massachusetts